The name Kabayan has been used in the Philippines by PAGASA in the Western Pacific. Kabayan means “countrymen” in Filipino language and is also the nickname of the former Vice President Noli de Castro.

 Typhoon Etau (2003) (T0310, 11W, Kabayan) – struck Japan.
 Typhoon Peipah (2007) (T0721, 21W, Kabayan) – struck the Philippines.
 Typhoon Muifa (2011) (T1109, 11W, Kabayan) – approached Japan, China and Korea.
 Typhoon Mujigae (2015) (T1522, 22W, Kabayan)
 Tropical Storm Kajiki (2019) (T1914, 16W, Kabayan) – formed after 3 storms devastated the Philippines with heavy rains.

Pacific typhoon set index articles